Rick Womick (born 1958) is an American politician. He served as a Republican member of the Tennessee House of Representatives for the 34th district from 2010 through 2016.

Early life
He was born on July 10, 1958, in Dallas, Texas. He received a Bachelor of Science in Education from the University of Dayton and received training at the Federal Law Enforcement Training Center.

Career
He worked as an airline pilot and United States Air Force fighter pilot for twenty-three years.

He is chairman of the Rutherford County Republican Party. Since 2010, he has served as state congressman for the 34th district of Tennessee. He is Vice-Chair of the House Civil Justice Committee, and a member of the House Consumer and Human Resources Committee and the House Civil Justice Subcommittee. He has made anti-Muslim remarks, suggesting all Muslims serving in the United States Army should be removed.

In November 2014, Womick introduced HB002, a bill that would require abortion providers to show a woman an ultrasound image of her fetus. If the woman declines to do so, the provider would be required to verbally describe the fetus, let the woman hear the heartbeat and provide the woman with an image of the ultrasound. The bill would also require a waiting period of at least 24 hours before getting the abortion. According to Womick, the bill is "about protecting the emotional and physical health of a woman."

In 2015, he sent a letter to county clerks in Tennessee asking them to ignore the United States Supreme Court's ruling in favour of same-sex marriage.

He is involved with the Boy Scouts of America, where he is an Eagle Scout. He is also a member of the Rutherford County Chamber of Commerce, the National Rifle Association, the Air Force Association, the Allied Pilots Association, Focus on the Family, the Tennessee Right to Life, the Tennessee Eagle Forum, and the World Taekwondo Federation.

Womick is a lieutenant colonel in the Tennessee State Guard.

Personal life
He is married, and he has four children. He is a Baptist and attends New Vision Baptist Church in Murfreesboro, Tennessee.

References

Living people
1958 births
American critics of Islam
Military personnel from Dallas
People from Rutherford County, Tennessee
University of Dayton alumni
United States Air Force officers
Republican Party members of the Tennessee House of Representatives
21st-century American politicians
Commercial aviators